Sibbett is a surname. Notable people with the surname include:

Jane Sibbett (born 1962), American actress and comedian
Wilson Sibbett (born 1948), British physicist

See also
Alva Sibbetts (1900–1980), Canadian ice hockey player